Bering Sea Gold is an American reality series that was first broadcast on Discovery Channel on January 27, 2012. The show follows miners as they try to mine gold in Nome, Alaska, in the summer as well as winter season.

As of July 9, 2021, 169 episodes of Bering Sea Gold have aired, concluding the thirteenth season.

Series overview

Episodes

Season 1 (2012)

Season 1 ICE (2012)

Season 2 (2013)

Pre-Season Special

Regular season

Season 2 ICE (2013)

Season 3 (2014)

Season 3 ICE (2014)

Season 4 (2015)

Season 5 (2015)

Season 6 (2016)

Season 7 (2016)

Season 8 (2017)

Season 9 (2017)

Season 10 (2018)

Season 11 (2019)

Season 13 (2021)

Specials

References

External links
 Official website
 

Bering Sea Gold
Episodes